Supachai Koysub (born 15 July 1977) is an athlete and Paralympian from Thailand competing mainly in category T54 sprint events.

Biography
He competed in the 2000 Summer Paralympics in Sydney, Australia.  There he won a gold medal in the men's 200 metres - T54 event, a gold medal in the men's 4 x 100 metre relay - T54 event, a silver medal in the men's 4 x 400 metre relay - T54 event, finished fourth in the men's 100 metres - T54 event and went out in the semi-finals of the men's 800 metres - T54 event.  He also competed at the 2004 Summer Paralympics in Athens, Greece.  There he won a gold medal in the men's 4 x 100 metre relay - T53-54 event, a gold medal in the men's 4 x 400 metre relay - T53-54 event, was disqualified in   the men's 100 metres - T54 event, finished fourth in the men's 200 metres - T54 event and finished seventh in the men's 400 metres - T54 event.  He also competed at the 2008 Summer Paralympics in Beijing, China.  There he won a silver medal in the men's 4 x 100 metre relay - T53-54 event, a silver medal in the men's 4 x 400 metre relay - T53-54 event, a bronze medal in the men's 100 metres - T54 event, went out in the first round of the men's 200 metres - T54 event and finished sixth in the men's 400 metres - T54 event

References

External links
 

1977 births
Living people
Supachai Koysub
Supachai Koysub
Supachai Koysub
Supachai Koysub
Supachai Koysub
Athletes (track and field) at the 2000 Summer Paralympics
Athletes (track and field) at the 2004 Summer Paralympics
Athletes (track and field) at the 2008 Summer Paralympics
Athletes (track and field) at the 2012 Summer Paralympics
Medalists at the 2000 Summer Paralympics
Medalists at the 2004 Summer Paralympics
Medalists at the 2008 Summer Paralympics
Medalists at the 2012 Summer Paralympics
Paralympic medalists in athletics (track and field)
Medalists at the 2010 Asian Para Games